Events from the year 1654 in art.

Events
October 12 – The Delft Explosion destroys the city of Delft, killing painter Carel Fabritius and destroying his home, studio and most of his paintings: only five are known to exist. Egbert van der Poel produces paintings of the explosion.

Paintings
 Willem Drost paints Bathsheba Holding King David's Letter, Portrait of an Officer in a Red Beret and (at about this date) Portrait of a Young Woman with her Hands Folded on a Book and Portrait of a Young Woman in a Brocade Gown.
 Carel Fabritius paints his Young Man in a Fur Cap, The Sentry, and The Goldfinch, showing use of lighting effects with a bright background.
 Rembrandt completes Bathsheba at Her Bath and Woman Bathing in a Stream (both featuring his mistress Hendrickje) and paints his Portrait of Jan Six.
 Bartholomeus van der Helst paints The Van Aras Family.
 Guercino paints Samson and Delilah.

Births
February 19 – Antonio Bellucci (or Antonijus Belutis), Italian painter from Treviso (died 1726)
February 24 – Bartolomeo Altomonte, Italian painter (died 1783)
March 10 – Giuseppe Bartolomeo Chiari, Italian painter of frescoes (died 1727)
November 2 – Giuseppe Passeri, Italian painter active in his native city of Rome (died 1714)
November 23 – Jan van Kessel the Younger, Flemish-Spanish painter (died 1708)
December 10 – Giovanni Gioseffo dal Sole, Italian landscape painter and engraver from Bologna (died 1719)
date unknown
Bartolomeo Guidobono, Italian painter active mainly in Northern Italy (died 1709)
Francisco Leonardoni, Italian painter active mainly in Spain (died 1711)
Giacomo del Pò, Italian painter of emblematical and allegorical subjects (died 1726)
Giacomo Antonio Ponsonelli, Italian Rococo sculptor (died 1735)
Michelangelo Ricciolino, Italian church painter of the Baroque period (died 1715)
probable – Herman Moll, engraver active in England (died 1732)

Deaths
January 17 – Paulus Potter, Dutch painter specializing in animals in landscapes (born 1625)
January 23 – Thomas Willeboirts Bosschaert, painter (born 1613)
February 8 – Luca Ferrari, Italian painter (born 1605)
April 5 – Lorenzo Garbieri, Italian painter (born 1580)
June 10 – Alessandro Algardi, Italian sculptor active mainly in Rome (born 1598)
October 12 – Carel Fabritius, Dutch painter (born 1622)
December 1 – Giacomo Apollonio, Italian painter (born 1584)
date unknown
Baccio Ciarpi, Italian painter (born 1574)
Nicolaes de Giselaer, Dutch painter and draughtsman (born 1583)

 
Years of the 17th century in art
1650s in art